Tiphook PLC was a United Kingdom headquartered transport services company, registered on the London and New York stock markets, which became the world's second largest marine container leasing business in the 1990s. The Company was once a constituent of the FTSE 100 Index.

Following a debt-fuelled buying spree in the late 1980s, it crashed in the early 1990s due to accounting changes brought about by its expansion into North America caused by a technical and then actual default in its debt coverage.

The rail leasing arm of the business briefly became International Wagon Services in 1996 before being acquired by GE into its European rail leasing business.

Background
Born in 1948, Robert Montague joined Esso from school, and then ran his father's transport business.

Business model
Montague founded Tiphook in 1975, and later became company chairman. It took advantage of the change in global transport practices, from the 1960s of loose cargo, to the 1980s of ISO-based intermodal containerised based transportation systems. This resulted in customers and transport companies requiring more flexible business solutions, resulting in Tiphook having two basic service offerings:
Supply of leased ISO containers
Supply of leased trailers, both road and railway
They supplemented this initial model with value-added services including maintenance and trans-border clearance.

Tiphook grew quickly by acquisition, buying companies by issuing new shares and taking on their existing debt. Such purchases included that of Barclays Bank owned Trailerent Ltd in 1989, which was referred to the Competition Commission. This method of expansion resulted in high levels of debt, assured to lenders through assets on Tiphook's balance sheet.

Difficulties and collapse
Tiphook owned most of its assets: mainly containers and road trailers. As the popularity of containers increased, their cost of manufacture dropped to around $2,000 per 40 ft ISO unit. This was below the asset value logged on Tiphook's book, which resulted in a technical default in Tiphook's loans under US Accountancy laws. This resulted in a proposed class action by US-based shareholders, as the published accounts were now in doubt.

There also followed revelations about Montague's lifestyle, including the fact that as well as buying company shares using loans from the company itself, he had 24-hour access to both a chauffeur-driven Bentley and a Hawker Siddeley HS124 corporate jet.

Tiphook and its directors, which included Charles Powell, came under severe shareholder pressure. The company resultantly agreed to reduce its debts by selling off its profitable containers business, eventually to Transamerica Corporation in February 1994 for $1.1Bn/£700M. It appointed former BOC finance director Ian Clubb as its new chairman in mid-1994 to bring stabilisation and renamed itself Central Transport Rental plc. Montague was forced to resign in December 1994, which resolved the class action.

Aftermath
In May 1996, Tiphook Rail was sold in a management buyout and renamed International Wagon Services Ltd. In 1998 it was purchased by GE Equipment Services to form part of its pan-European rail services business Cargowaggon.

The residual company branded as Tiphook Trailers, which by 1997 operated a fleet of 22,500 trailers at 132 depots in nine European countries, was sold in 1997 to GE Capital, merged with its existing TIP Trailer Services rental and leasing company.

Montague was declared bankrupt. After release from his legal obligation, in 1995 he started pan-European transport equipment leasing company Axis, which he folded in 2004 into the later AIM-listed Intermodal Resources. This company is now known as Sea-Axis.

In light of Tiphook and the Robert Maxwell scandal at the Daily Mirror, the UK Government introduced the earliest stages of legislation covering corporate governance.

See also 
 Kangourou wagon
 Pocket wagon
 Well car

References

Transport companies established in 1975
Truck rental
Rolling stock leasing companies
Companies formerly listed on the London Stock Exchange
Companies formerly listed on the New York Stock Exchange
Transport companies disestablished in 1997
1975 establishments in England
1997 disestablishments in England